Snitch may refer to:
 Informant

Film and television
 Snitch (1998 film) or Monument Ave., an American crime drama directed by Ted Demme
 Snitch (2011 film) or Witness Insecurity, an American thriller starring Edward Furlong
 Snitch (film), a 2013 American crime drama starring Dwayne Johnson
 "Snitch" (Law & Order: Special Victims Unit), a 2007 episode
 "Snitch" (The Shield), a 2008 episode
 "Snitch" (Tower Prep), a 2010 episode

Music
 "Snitch" (song), by Obie Trice, 2006
 "Snitch", a song by Netsky with Aloe Blacc, 2019

Other uses
 Golden Snitch or Snitch, a ball in Quidditch in the Harry Potter series
 Snitch Newsweekly, a 2000–2005 American newspaper covering crime and police news
 Steve Snitch (born 1983), English rugby league footballer

See also
 Little Snitch, a software firewall for Mac OS X